Dehkestan (also Romanized as Dehkestān; also known as Dahkestān) is a village in Bakhtajerd Rural District, in the Central District of Darab County, Fars Province, Iran. At the 2006 census, its population was 190, in 45 families.

References 

Populated places in Darab County